Jerry L. Nelson (July 10, 1934 – August 23, 2012) was an American puppeteer, best known for his work with The Muppets. Renowned for his wide range of characters and singing abilities, he performed Muppet characters on Sesame Street, The Muppet Show, Fraggle Rock, and various Muppet movies and specials.

Career
On Sesame Street, Nelson's longest-running character was Count von Count, the counting vampire who takes delight in counting anything (and everything) he can. Nelson did the voice and puppetry for the Count from 1972 until 2004 and continued to provide the Count's voice until his death in 2012. His other Muppet roles on that program were Herbert Birdsfoot, The Amazing Mumford, Herry Monster, Biff, Mr. Johnson, Simon Soundman, Mr. Chatterly, Frazzle, Little Jerry, and Sherlock Hemlock. He has also made a total of nine onscreen appearances on the show.

Nelson was the first puppeteer to perform Mr. Snuffleupagus, keeping the role from 1971 to 1978. Most sources (including Sesame Street Unpaved and Sesame Street: A Celebration - 40 Years of Life on the Street) state that back problems caused by the physical stress of the performance forced him to bow out, but in a 2009 interview Nelson gave a different explanation for giving up the role: "I was not loath to give that character up. But the reasons for giving it up were because at that time we were doing The Muppet Show and he was a real part of the show, and they needed his presence. So they asked if I'd mind giving it up."

Nelson also performed many characters on The Muppet Show, including Sgt. Floyd Pepper (the bassist of the Electric Mayhem band), Pigs in Space star Dr. Julius Strangepork, the boomerang fish-throwing Lew Zealand, Kermit the Frog's nephew Robin the Frog, Gonzo's girlfriend Camilla the Chicken, the mad pyrotechnist Crazy Harry, and "the Phantom of the Muppet Show", Uncle Deadly. He performed Statler in the pilot episode but was replaced by Richard Hunt when he could not perform full-time in the first season. He was a full-time performer for the rest of the show's run. Nelson was also selected to play Statler after Hunt's death, after the end of the show.

Less prominent characters on the show include sportscaster Louis Kazagger, Pops the doorman, giant blue monster Thog, gossip columnist Fleet Scribbler, and Scooter's uncle, J.P. Grosse, who owned the theater. He originated the role of Fozzie Bear's mother in season 2 of The Muppet Show and reprised the role in the TV specials A Muppet Family Christmas, The Muppets at Walt Disney World, and the film The Muppet Christmas Carol.

Nelson performed the puppet and voice of Emmet in Emmet Otter's Jug-Band Christmas, a one-hour special that originally aired on CBC. He later performed the signature song from that show, "When the River Meets the Sea," as Robin, in a duet with John Denver for a Muppet Christmas special. That version of the song gets frequent radio airplay during the Christmas season (although the song is not seasonal). He and Louise Gold performed the song at Jim Henson’s Memorial Service.

On Fraggle Rock, he performed Gobo Fraggle, Pa Gorg, and Marjory the Trash Heap. Frank Oz did not perform on Fraggle Rock, and Jim Henson and Hunt limited their time on the show, so they performed supporting characters. For this reason, Nelson was asked to perform Gobo, the central role on the show.

Nelson's characters were often singers or musicians. He performed the lead vocals for many songs as Floyd of the Electric Mayhem, Little Jerry of Little Jerry and the Monotones, Slim Wilson of Lubbock Lou and his Jughuggers, and a number of Anything Muppet bands. Most of his main characters in all three shows sang songs at one time or another.

He reprised the role of the announcer in The Muppets. His final performance as the announcer was part of the Jim Henson's Musical World concert at Carnegie Hall. Archive audio of his announcer role was reused in Muppets Most Wanted, which was dedicated to both Nelson and Jane Henson, wife of Muppets' creator Jim Henson.

In 2001, Nelson also performed the character voice of General Public in the Cartoon Network animated series Sheep in the Big City in the episode "Daddy Shearest".

In December 2009, Nelson, who summered in Truro, Massachusetts on Cape Cod, released Truro Daydreams, an album of original songs.

Personal life
Nelson had a daughter named Christine from his first marriage to Jacqueline Nelson Gordon. Christine had cystic fibrosis and died from the disease in 1982, after attending Rye Country Day School. Caring for her limited Nelson's involvement in The Muppet Shows first season. She made a cameo appearance with him in the second Muppet movie, The Great Muppet Caper. He then married his second wife Jan Nelson in 1984, and they remained married until his death in 2012.

In 2004, Nelson announced that he would no longer be puppeteering his Muppet characters, citing health reasons. However, he continued to voice his characters on Sesame Street until his death on August 23, 2012. Matt Vogel currently performs most of Nelson's Muppet characters.

Illness and death
Nelson suffered from prostate cancer, chronic obstructive pulmonary disease, and emphysema. For the last six years of his life, he required an oxygen tank to assist his breathing. On August 23, 2012, Jerry Nelson died at his Cape Cod home from complications of his illnesses, at the age of 78.The film Muppets Most Wanted was dedicated to him and Jane Henson.

Filmography

Video games

References

External links
 

1934 births
2012 deaths
Deaths from cancer in Massachusetts
Respiratory disease deaths in Massachusetts
Deaths from emphysema
Deaths from chronic obstructive pulmonary disease
Deaths from prostate cancer
American puppeteers
American male voice actors
Muppet performers
Sesame Street Muppeteers
Fraggle Rock performers
Male actors from Tulsa, Oklahoma
Primetime Emmy Award winners
American male singers